Chasing The Rise is a Lithuanian metalcore band from Vilnius, Lithuania, formed in 2012. The band released their debut EP "The Dawn" in 2013, and the follow-up EP "Chapters" in 2016.

History 
Chasing The Rise was formed in 2012. Their debut EP "The Dawn" was the first Lithuanian metalcore official release. It was followed by the 2014 single "Internal Fight", with the accompanying music video. In 2016 the band released their second EP "Chapters", which was mixed and mastered by Andreas Magnusson. Two music videos were released from the EP - "Sleeper Awakens" and "Maybe It's Just Me".

Musical style 
Chasing The Rise is primarily a metalcore band, while also mixing it with traces of melodic death metal, and more recently with progressive metal on the "Chapters" EP.

Members

Current
 Vytis Gontis - Vocals (2012–present)
 Remigijus Juškėnas - Guitar (2012–present)
 Edgaras Kolomiecas - Guitar (2012–present)
 Andrej Chatkevič - Bass guitar (2015–present)
 Tomas Urbanavičius - Drums (2016–present)

Former
 Edvardas Rogoža - Bass guitar (2012 - 2015)
 Laisvis Norbutas - Drums (2012 - 2014)

References 

Lithuanian musical groups
Metalcore musical groups